Phylloxiphia bicolor is a moth of the family Sphingidae. It is known from forests from Sierra Leone to the Congo and Angola.

References

Phylloxiphia
Moths described in 1894
Moths of Africa